The Ivorian Party of Workers (PIT) is a centre-left, democratic socialist and social democratic political party in Ivory Coast. It is led by Francis Wodié and was founded on April 8, 1990.

The PIT ran Wodié as its candidate in both the 1995 and 2000 presidential elections. He was the only candidate standing against President Henri Konan Bédié in the October 1995 presidential election, which was boycotted by other opposition parties; he won 3.52% of the votes. In the October 2000 presidential election, Wodié placed third with 5.7% of the votes.

In the parliamentary election held on 10 December 2000 and 14 January 2001, the party won 4 out of 225 seats in the National Assembly of Ivory Coast.

Wodié led the party as its First National Secretary from the time of its Constitutive Congress until the party's 3rd Ordinary Congress in August 2004, when he was elected as President of the PIT. Since 2015, the current leader is Joseph Séka Séka.

Electoral history

Presidential elections

National Assembly elections

References

External links
Official website

1990 establishments in Ivory Coast
Democratic socialist parties in Africa
Political parties established in 1990
Political parties in Ivory Coast
Social democratic parties in Africa
Socialist parties in Ivory Coast